The Winnetoon Jail in Winnetoon, Nebraska was built in 1907.  It was listed on the National Register of Historic Places in 1995.

It was built for $37.00.

References

Jails on the National Register of Historic Places in Nebraska
Buildings and structures completed in 1907
Buildings and structures in Knox County, Nebraska